Aubrey Mixes: The Ultraworld Excursions is a remix album compilation by The Orb, which was deleted on the day it was released. The album consists of seven alternate mixes of their first album, The Orb's Adventures Beyond the Ultraworld. Five of these mixes are also available on the 2006 Deluxe Edition re-release of The Orb's Adventures Beyond the Ultraworld.

Track listing
Big Life – BLR LP14, 511811-1:

References

The Orb albums
1992 remix albums
Ambient house albums
albums produced by Youth (musician)